Rémi Boutillier (born 15 January 1990) is a French tennis player.

Boutillier has a career high ATP singles ranking of 235 achieved on 25 May 2015. He also has a career high ATP doubles ranking of 340 achieved on 9 June 2014. He has won 6 ITF singles titles and 7 ITF doubles titles.

Boutillier won his first ATP Challenger title at the 2015 Internationaux de Tennis de BLOIS in the doubles event partnering Maxime Teixeira.

References

External links
 
 

French male tennis players
1990 births
Living people
People from Briançon
Fresno State Bulldogs men's tennis players
Sportspeople from Hautes-Alpes